Kuala Ketil is a state constituency in Kedah, Malaysia, that has been represented in the Kedah State Legislative Assembly.

References 

Kedah state constituencies